The Redemption of David Corson is a lost 1914 silent film drama directed by Frederick A. Thomson and starring William Farnum. It was produced by Daniel Frohman and Adolph Zukor.

This story was based on a novel The Redemption of David Corson by Charles Frederic Goss. In 1906 Lottie Blair Parker, of Way Down East fame,  wrote a Broadway play version.

Cast
William Farnum - David Corson
Robert Broderick - Dr. Parcelsus
Constance Mollineaux - Pepeeta, the gypsy girl
Hal Clarendon - Andy MacFarlane
Helen Aubrey - David's Mother
William Cowper - Elder Sprague
Leonard Grover - Justice of the Peace
William Vaughn - The Gypsy Chief (*see Wilhelm von Brincken)

References

External links
 The Redemption of David Corson at IMDb.com

1914 films
Lost American films
Films based on American novels
Famous Players-Lasky films
American silent feature films
American black-and-white films
Silent American drama films
1914 drama films
Films directed by Frederick A. Thomson
1910s American films
1910s English-language films